Peter Schyrba (born October 17, 1980) is a German footballer who played in the 2. Bundesliga for MSV Duisburg and Hansa Rostock.

External links

1980 births
Living people
German footballers
German people of Polish descent
MSV Duisburg players
SC Preußen Münster players
Panserraikos F.C. players
Holstein Kiel players
FC Hansa Rostock players
Bundesliga players
2. Bundesliga players
3. Liga players
Association football defenders